The Diocese of Tuxpan It was erected 9 June 1962. The diocese is a suffragan in the ecclesiastical province of the metropolitan Archdiocese of Xalapa.

Bishops

Ordinaries
Ignacio Lehonor Arroyo (1963-1982) 
Mario de Gasperín Gasperín (1983-1989), appointed Bishop of Querétaro
Luis Gabriel Cuara Méndez (1989-2000), appointed Bishop of Veracruz
Domingo Díaz Martínez (2002-2008), appointed Archbishop of Tulancingo, Hidalgo
Juan Navarro Castellanos (2009-2021)
Roberto Madrigal Gallegos (2021-)

Other priest of this diocese who became bishop
Francisco Eduardo Cervantes Merino, appointed Bishop of Orizaba, Veracruz in 2015

Episcopal See
Tuxpan, Veracruz

External links and references

Tuxpan
Tuxpan, Roman Catholic Diocese of
Tuxpan
Tuxpan